= Ron van Niekerk =

Dutch footballer

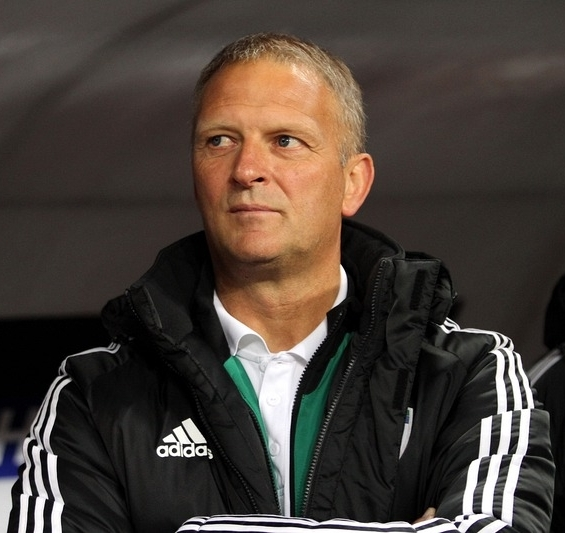

Personal information
- Full name: Ronald van Niekerk
- Date of birth: 19 March 1956 (age 70)
- Place of birth: Netherlands
- Position: Midfielder

Senior career*
Years	Team	Apps	(Gls)
-1982	HFC Haarlem	4+	(0+)
1982-1983	SC Telstar		
- * Club domestic league appearances and goals

Ron van Niekerk (Russian: Ван Никерк; born 19 March 1956 in the Netherlands) is a Dutch retired footballer.
